Adm. Hendrick Corneliszoon Lonck (or Loncque and Loncq) (born 1568, Roosendaal – 10 October 1634, Amsterdam), a Dutch naval hero, was the first Dutch sea captain to reach the New World.

Early years
He was born in Roosendaal in the southern Netherlands, of Brabant origin. His parents were Cornelis Pieterszoon Lonck and Dichna Heinrich.  He was a full cousin of the Zeeland Vice Admiral Cornelis Symons Son Loncque. In 1604, he married Grietgen Lenaerts in Antwerp.

Career
In 1606, Lonck captained the Witte Leeuw (White Lion), a 320-ton merchant ship armed for war, and approached the Gulf of St. Lawrence. Near Tadoussac, he boarded two of Pierre Dugua, Sieur de Mons' ships, pillaging them for cannons, furs, mounts, and munitions.

In 1623 and 1624, Lonck participated in the expedition of Admiral Willem de Zoete against the Barbary Coast pirates. Having made admiral by 1628, Lonck, in the service of the Dutch West Indies Company, joined Admiral Piet Hein in the Battle in the Bay of Matanzas, a naval battle during the Eighty Years' War in which a Dutch squadron was able to defeat and capture a Spanish treasure fleet.

Lonck replaced Hein in 1629 as captain-general.  In 1630, he commanded a Dutch colonizing expedition of 52 ships, 15 sloops, and 3,780 sailors that captured the historic city of Olinda, Brazil on 14 February, followed by the capture of the Brazilian state of Pernambuco after a feeble resistance by Matias de Albuquerque, its Portuguese Governor. It was to be his last voyage, returning to the Netherlands on 20 July 1630.

He died in Amsterdam and was buried on 10 October 1634 in the Oude Kerk in Amsterdam.

References 

1568 births
1634 deaths
Admirals of the navy of the Dutch Republic
Burials at the Oude Kerk, Amsterdam
People from Roosendaal
People of Dutch Brazil
Sailors on ships of the Dutch West India Company